Woman of the Year is a musical with a book by Peter Stone and score by John Kander and Fred Ebb.

Based on the Ring Lardner Jr.-Michael Kanin screenplay for the 1942 Katharine Hepburn-Spencer Tracy film Woman of the Year, the musical changes the newspaper reporters of the original to television personality Tess Harding and cartoonist Sam Craig, who experience difficulty merging their careers with their marriage. The musical premiered on Broadway in 1981 and starred Lauren Bacall.

Plot

Just before Tess Harding, a nationally known television news personality, comes on stage to receive an award as "Woman of the Year", she reminisces about an on-air editorial that she gave denigrating newspaper comic strips.  The article offended the cartoonists who frequent the Ink Pot saloon and inspired syndicated cartoonist Sam Craig to publish a caricature depicting her as a snob in his strip Katz. Tess is annoyed, but when the handsome and charming Sam shows up at her office, she apologizes and invites him to dinner.  At the Ink Pot, she charms Sam and his colleagues by revealing her knowledge about comic art.

Tess and Sam begin a romance, move in together, and finally marry, but their busy careers leave little time for them to spend together, and their big egos pose problems in their marriage.  In one of his comics, Katz quips that marriage is a breeze - it's the living together that's so damned hard. Tess is offended, an argument ensues, and Sam announces he no longer can deal with the couple's fraying love life. The time moves forward to the present, and it's time for Tess to accept her award, just as she has lost the man she loves.

Several weeks later, Tess is conflicted about her role as a powerful newswoman versus her role as a wife. She seeks advice from Russian ballet dancer Alexi Petrikov, whom she helped to defect. He tells her that he is returning to Russia, because the wife he left behind is more important than his career. Tess travels to visit first husband Larry Donovan and his wife Jan to discover why their marriage is a success. She decides to concentrate on her marriage and announces that she is resigning from her show.  But Sam tells her that he wants her to keep her career; he just wants to be involved in the decisions in their relationship.  They decide to work things out.

Songs

Act I      
 "Woman of the Year" – Tess and Women
 "The Poker Game" – Sam and Cartoonists
 "See You in the Funny Papers" – Sam
 "When You're Right, You're Right!" – Tess and Gerald
 "Shut Up, Gerald" – Tess, Sam and Gerald
 "So What Else Is New?" – Sam and Katz
 "One of the Boys" – Tess, Cartoonists, Maury and Men
 "Table Talk" – Tess and Sam
 "The Two of Us" – Tess and Sam
 "It Isn't Working" – Cartoonists, Chip, Helga, Gerald and New Yorkers
 "I Told You So" – Gerald and Helga
 "Woman of the Year (Reprise)" – Tess

Act II
 "So What Else Is New? (Reprise)" – Sam and Katz
 "I Wrote the Book" – Tess and Cleaning Women
 "Happy in the Morning" – Alexi, Tess and Dancers
 "Sometimes a Day Goes By" – Sam
 "The Grass Is Always Greener" – Tess and Jan
 "We're Gonna Work It Out" – Tess and Sam

Original Broadway cast
Tess Harding, a famous TV news personality - Lauren Bacall
Sam Craig, a handsome cartoonist - Harry Guardino
Alexi Petrikov, a Russian ballet dancer - Eivind Harum
Gerald, Tess's secretary - Roderick Cook
Helga, Tess's maid - Grace Keagy
Larry Donovan, Tess's first husband - Jamie Ross
Jan Donovan, a housewife, Larry's second wife - Marilyn Cooper
Chip Salisbury, a perky newsman - Daren Kelly
Abbott Canfield, a cartoonist - Larry Raiken
Maury - Rex Everhart 
Ellis McMaster - Rex Hays
Pinky Peters - Gerry Vichi

Productions
The Broadway production opened on March 29, 1981, at the Palace Theatre, where it ran for 770 performances and eleven previews. Directed by Robert Moore, the cast included Lauren Bacall, Harry Guardino, Marilyn Cooper, Grace Keagy, and Roderick Cook.  Raquel Welch filled in for Bacall during her two-week vacation and later replaced her in the run. Debbie Reynolds replaced Welch in February 1983.  Barbara Eden played Tess in the 1984 national tour.

Sets were designed by Tony Walton and costumes were by Theoni V. Aldredge, and choreography was by Tony Charmoli.  Michael Sporn created an animated cat that danced and sang with Guardino.

Porchlight Music Theatre presented this show as a part of their "Porchlight Revisits" season in which they produce three forgotten musicals per year. This production was in Chicago, Illinois, in November 2017. It was directed by Artistic Director, Michael Weber, choreographed by Florence Walker Harris, and music directed by David Fiorello.

Awards and nominations

Original Broadway production

References

"Woman of the Year", The Guide to Musical Theatre.
Cast and other information, Stage Agent.
T. E. Kalem, "Supremely Sophisticated Lady", review of Woman of the Year, Time magazine, April 13, 1981

External links
 

1981 musicals
Broadway musicals
Musicals based on films
Musicals by Kander and Ebb
Musicals by Peter Stone
Tony Award-winning musicals